Dermatoxys is a genus of nematodes belonging to the family Heteroxynematidae.

The species of this genus are found in North America.

Species:

Dermatoxys hispaniensis 
Dermatoxys schumakovitschi 
Dermatoxys veligera

References

Nematodes